The Extraordinary and Plenipotentiary Ambassador of Peru to the Republic of Ireland is the official representative of the Republic of Peru to the Republic of Ireland.

Relations between Peru and Ireland were established on June 27, 1999. Until 2017, the Peruvian ambassador in London was concurrent with Ireland. After the inauguration of a Peruvian embassy on September 2017, the Peruvian ambassador resides in Dublin.

List of representatives

See also
List of ambassadors of Peru to the United Kingdom

References

Ireland
Peru